The geography of the North Sea studies coastal and submarine features as well as the people who live on its coasts. It is bounded by the east coasts of England and Scotland to the west and the northern and central European mainland to the east and south, including Norway, Denmark, Germany, the Netherlands, Belgium, and France. In the south-west, beyond the Straits of Dover, the North Sea becomes the English Channel. In the east, it connects to the Baltic Sea via the Skagerrak and Kattegat, narrow straits that separate Denmark from Norway and Sweden respectively. In the north, it opens in a widening funnel shape to the Norwegian Sea, which lies in the very north-eastern part of the Atlantic.

Extent
The International Hydrographic Organization defines the limits of the North Sea as follows:
On the Southwest. A line joining the Walde Lighthouse (France, 1°55'E) and Leathercoat Point (England, 51°10'N).

On the Northwest. From Dunnet Head (3°22'W) in Scotland to Tor Ness (58°47'N) in the Island of Hoy, thence through this island to the Kame of Hoy (58°55'N) on to Breck Ness on Mainland (58°58'N) through this island to Costa Head (3°14'W) and to Inga Ness (59'17'N) in Westray through Westray, to Bow Head, across to Mull Head (North point of Papa Westray) and on to Seal Skerry (North point of North Ronaldsay) and thence to Horse Island (South point of the Shetland Islands).

On the North. From the North point (Fethaland Point) of the Mainland of the Shetland Islands, across to Graveland Ness (60°39'N) in the Island of Yell, through Yell to Gloup Ness (1°04'W) and across to Spoo Ness (60°45'N) in Unst island, through Unst to Herma Ness (60°51'N), on to the SW point of the Rumblings and to Muckle Flugga all these being included in the North Sea area; thence up the meridian of 0°53' West to the parallel of 61°00' North and eastward along this parallel to the coast of Norway, the whole of Viking Bank being thus included in the North Sea.

On the East. The Western limit of the Skagerrak [A line joining Hanstholm and the Naze (Lindesnes)].

Submarine topography

The seabed is separated into three  bathymetric areas, the Norwegian Trench and the north and south North Sea separated by the Dogger Bank.
For the most part, the sea lies on the European continental shelf. The only exception is the Norwegian trench, which reaches from the Stad peninsula in Sogn og Fjordane to the Oslofjord. The trench is not a subduction-related oceanic trench, where one tectonic plate is being forced under another. It is mainly a deep erosional scour, while the western part follows the North-South line of an old rift valley formed during the Jurassic and Cretaceous periods.

The Silver Pit is a hollow or valley-like depression that has been recognised since about 1843 by fishermen. Nearby is the Silverpit crater, a controversial structure initially proposed to be an impact crater, though another interpretation is that it may result from the dissolution of a thick bed of salt which permitted the upper strata to collapse.
It is located parallel to the shore of Scotland between Kinnaird's Head and Aberdeen. The Broad Fourteens are a sand bar ridge between eleven and fourteen fathoms (20 m and 26 m) deep located off the Flemish and Danish coasts.

Coordinates

See also
List of rivers discharging into the North Sea
Bell Rock Lighthouse

References

North Sea